Ed Voss (1922 – March 21, 1953) was an American basketball player.

College basketball career
A  center from University High School in Oakland, California, Voss played collegiately for Stanford University. As the team's starting center, he helped Stanford to the 1942 NCAA Championship, in which he played all 40 minutes and scored 13 points.

After college
Following his college career, Voss played for the Oakland Bittners of the Amateur Athletic Union, and was a member of the Bittners' 1949 AAU championship team. Married with three children, he died of polio at the age of 31, a month after his 7-year-old son also succumbed to the disease. He is a member of the Stanford Athletic Hall of Fame.

References

1922 births
1953 deaths
Amateur Athletic Union men's basketball players
Basketball players from Oakland, California
Centers (basketball)
Deaths from polio
Stanford Cardinal men's basketball players
American men's basketball players